Mister England, Mr. England or Mr England, may refer to:

 Peter Cross (rugby union), nicknamed Mr England, an English rugby union fan
 Mister England, a biennial regional male beauty pageant feeder title for competing in Mister World
 Mr. England, an annual male bodybuilding competition title for the UK's National Amateur Body-Builders' Association
 Mr. England, a man with the surname England (surname)

See also
 England (disambiguation)
 MR (disambiguation)